Castels et Bézenac is a commune in the department of Dordogne, southwestern France. The municipality was established on 1 January 2017 by merger of the former communes of Castels (the seat) and Bézenac.

See also 
Communes of the Dordogne department

References 

Communes of Dordogne